Krisztina Tóth may refer to:

 Krisztina Tóth (table tennis) (born 1974), Hungarian table tennis player
 Krisztina Tóth (writer) (born 1967), Hungarian writer and poet